Boris Pavlov may refer to:
Boris Pavlov (equestrian) (born 1946), Bulgarian equestrian
Boris Pavlov (weightlifter) (1947–2008), Russian weightlifter